First Generation is a bronze sculpture by Singaporean sculptor Chong Fah Cheong. The sculpture was created as part of a series of sculptures by various sculptors, in the Open Air Interpretative Centre project by the Singapore Tourism Board. Chong's sculpture was the first to be unveiled on December 31, 2000.

References

Bronze sculptures in Singapore
Outdoor sculptures in Singapore
Public art in Singapore
Statues